My Brother Has a Cute Brother is a 1975 Czech comedy film directed by Stanislav Strnad. It was entered into the 9th Moscow International Film Festival where it won a Silver Prize.

Cast
 Libuše Šafránková as Zuzana
 Jan Hrušínský as Honza
 Roman Čada as Martin
 Ivana Maříková as Pavlínka
 Slávka Budínová as Pavelková
 Josef Bláha as Pavelka
 Blažena Holisová as Vránová
 Vladimír Menšík as Vrána
 Zdeněk Řehoř as Dr. Navrátil
 Otakar Brousek, Sr. as Colonel

References

External links
 

1975 films
1975 comedy films
Czech comedy films
Czechoslovak comedy films
1970s Czech-language films
1970s Czech films